English Studies is a peer-reviewed academic journal covering the language, literature, and culture of the English-speaking world from the Anglo-Saxon to the present day. The editor-in-chief is Chris Loutitt (Radboud University Nijmegen). The journal was established in 1919 and is published by Routledge.

Special edition issues
The journal publishes each year special edition issues that contain articles on curated topics that are relevant to the English writing community.

Abstracting and indexing
The journal is abstracted and indexed in the Arts and Humanities Citation Index, Linguistics and Language Behavior Abstracts, MLA International Bibliography, and Scopus.

References

External links
 

Area studies journals
Taylor & Francis academic journals
Publications established in 1919
English-language journals
8 times per year journals